Mohammad Javad Haj Ali Akbari is an Iranian conservative politician and a Twelver cleric. He serves as temporary Imam of Friday Prayer in Tehran.

Early life 
Akbari obtained his bachelor's degree in the subject of fiqh and Islamic law after studying elementary (related) education. He studied in the superior levels and "Kharej-Fiqh Osul" (a kind of high level lessons in seminary) while learning Arabic and English.

Among his known teachers are: Seyyed Ali Khamenei, Mohammad-Taqi Bahjat Foumani, Abdollah Javadi-Amoli, Mohammed Emami-Kashani and Aziz Khoshvaght.

Career 
Iranian Supreme leader Ali Khamenei, appointed him as chief of "Imams of Friday Prayer Policy Council" in 2018.

He served as head of "Imam Sadiq Seminary", Damavant Imam-Jom'ah", the representative of the supreme leader in the "Union of students Islamic Associations".

Mahsa Amini protests
In the wake of the Mahsa Amini protests, Ali-Akbari said, "Our security is our distinctive privilege. The Iranian people demand the harshest punishment for these barbaric rioters," at the Friday prayers on September 30th 2022.

See also 

 Seyyed Ali Khamenei
 Ahmad Khatami
 Aboutorabi Fard
 Movahedi-Kermani
 Friday prayer

References 

Iranian Shia clerics
Representatives of the Supreme Leader
Living people
1965 births
People from Mazandaran Province